Lola or What I Know About Lola is a 2006 Spanish-French film directed by  which stars Michaël Abiteboul and Lola Dueñas as Léon and Lola alongside Carmen Machi and Lucienne Deschamps .

Plot 
Set in Paris, the plot concerns Léon, an asocial man living with his mother who starts observing newcomer Lola, a vivacious Spaniard.

Cast

Production 
The screenplay was penned by Javier Rebollo and Lola Mayo. A Spanish-French co-production, the film was produced by a Lazennec & Associes, Lolita Films and Malvarrosa Media with the participation of TVE and RTVV.

Release 
The film premiered at the San Sebastián International Film Festival in September 2006. It also screened at the 50th London Film Festival in 2006, and at the 8th Seoul International Film Festival in 2007. It opened in Spanish theatres on 29 September 2006, and it did so in French theatres on 1 August 2007. Santiago Racaj was responsible for cinematography whereas  took over film editing.

Reception 
Javier Ocaña of El País pointed out that "by means of fixed shots, ultra-orthodox framing and a scrupulous control of the point of view", Rebollo tells us, as if the film were a documentary about animals, about "human fauna".

Mirito Torreiro of Fotogramas rated the film 3 out of 5 stars, praising the "coherence with which it presents a story of voyeurism without moral alibis", while citing the "(necessary) weariness that runs through some moments of the plot" as the worst thing about it.

Jonathan Holland of Variety deemed the film to be "a meticulously constructed and ambitious if somewhat ponderous take on loneliness", "making for an interesting but ultimately uninvolving experience", in which Lola Dueñas is "easily the best thing" about it.

Accolades 

|-
| align = "center" | 2006 || 50th London Film Festival || colspan = "2" | FIPRESCI Jury Award ||  || align = "center" | 
|-
| align = "center" | 2007 || 21st Goya Awards || Best New Director || Javier Rebollo ||  || align = "center" | 
|}

See also 
 List of Spanish films of 2006
 List of French films of 2007

References

External links 
 Lola at ICAA's Catálogo de Cinespañol

2006 films
Spanish drama films
French drama films
Films set in Paris
2000s Spanish films
2000s French films